Tenax is the brandname of Toho Tenax owned by Teijin for a carbon fiber.
Tenax-7R is an adhesive particularly suited for welding plastics .

See also
 Teijin
 Toho Tenax

Other uses
Tenax is also a brand name for Poly(2,6-diphenylphenylene oxide), a porous polymer.

External links
 Official Toho Tenax website

Composite materials